Voot is an Indian subscription video on-demand and over-the-top streaming service, owned by Viacom18. Launched in March 2016, it is Viacom18's advertising-led video-on-demand platform that is available as an app for iOS, KaiOS (JioPhone) and Android users, and a website for desktop consumption. It also accessible through Amazon Fire TV, Roku (for Virgin Media and Sling TV subscribers), Apple TV, Android TV and Chromecast devices.

Voot is available only in India, United States and United Kingdom, and hosts over 40,000 hours of video content that includes shows from channels like MTV, Nickelodeon and Colors. Content is also available in multiple languages like Kannada, Marathi, Bengali, Gujarati, Odia, Telugu and Tamil.

In February 2020, Voot introduces paid subscription service called Voot Select. Voot Original series are made available only to paid subscribers. Some TV shows are being streamed a day before TV for its paid subscribers. Entertainment network announced a partnership on April 27 with Bodhi Tree Systems, the content platform of media baron James Murdoch and former Disney India chief Uday Shankar, to create a TV and streaming giant.

In May 2022, Paramount Global announced that Paramount+ would launch in India from Viacom18 in 2023. It is still unclear whether it will replace Voot.

Programming
Voot has content from Colors TV, MTV, Nickelodeon and other Viacom 18 owned television channels. It also hosts many Bollywood films for streaming. It has produced several 'Voot Original' shows for streaming as well. In the children's segment, it is working on shows in Malayalam.

In March 2021, It was announced that Voot will be the exclusive home for original series from its sister streamer Paramount+ and it is available on Voot Select.

Original programs

See also
 MTV India
 Paramount+
 Nick+
 BET+
 Pluto TV
 My5
 Philo
 Noggin
 JioCinema
 List of streaming media services
 Video on demand
 Digital rights management
 TV18
 Over-the-top (OTT)

References

External links
 

Subscription video on demand services
Indian entertainment websites
Viacom 18
2016 establishments in Maharashtra
Indian companies established in 2016
Mass media companies based in Mumbai
Mass media companies established in 2016